Anne Dias-Griffin (born January 1, 1970) is a French-American investor and philanthropist. She is the founder and chief executive officer of Aragon, an investment firm active in global equities, with a focus on the internet, technology, and consumer sectors, as well as alternative assets.

Early life and education
Dias was born in Strasbourg, France. She moved to the United States to study at the Georgetown University School of Foreign Service in 1992. She graduated summa cum laude and received an MBA from Harvard Business School.

Dias worked full-time in public policy research during college, on both domestic and foreign policy issues. She was a research assistant to constitutional law scholar Walter Berns, the Olin Professor of Government at Georgetown University, and helped research a book on the Electoral College.  She also assisted Patrick J. Glynn, resident scholar at the American Enterprise Institute, on his book about the history of the Cold War.

In 1991, she was the Brussels representative for the American Electronics Association, and focused on European policy issues.  She also worked on European Community and foreign policy issues as an intern at the German Parliament in Bonn and Berlin during the summer of 1992.

Investment career

Early career 
After receiving her degree from Georgetown University, Anne worked as an analyst in the Investment Banking department of Goldman Sachs in London and New York City and at Fidelity Investments Limited in London.

After obtaining her MBA from Harvard Business School in 1997, she joined Soros Fund Management as an analyst and was promoted to portfolio manager one year later.

At Soros, she specialized in the retail and financial services industry and managed a long/short portfolio of financial services stocks. Dias was a member of the founding investment team at Viking Global Investors, focusing on global media and internet investments.

Aragon Global Management
In 2001, Dias started her own fund, Aragon Global Management, LLC in New York City.

Billionaire Julian Robertson of Tiger Management provided start-up capital for Aragon Global Management.

At the end of 2011, Dias returned capital from outside investors to focus on the Kenneth and Anne Griffin Foundation, and ran Aragon as a family office. Aragon re-opened to third-party capital in June 2021.

In 2022, Dias is part of Barron's 100 Most Influential Women in US Finance.

Corporate boards
Dias sits on the board of Fox Corporation.

Philanthropy

Kenneth and Anne Griffin Foundation
Dias was co-president of the Kenneth and Anne Griffin Foundation, which she co-founded in 2009; it was dissolved in 2014 due to the couple's divorce. The foundation focused on early childhood education, the arts, and medical research, with particular emphasis on the health of women and children. The Griffins pledged more than $100 million to leading innovators and entrepreneurs whose initiatives are bringing measurable and sustainable change to the community. Dias organized a national conference on early childhood education every year in Chicago for teachers, academic researchers and public policy experts.

In 2006, Dias and Griffin gave $19 million to the Art Institute of Chicago, and in 2009, the Griffin's donated $10 million to establish the Griffin Early Childhood Center.

In 2010, they donated $16 million to the Ann & Robert H. Lurie Children's Hospital of Chicago of Chicago at Northwestern University to create an Emergency Care Center, which opened in 2012.

In 2010, Dias founded the Chicago Heights Early Childhood Center (CHECC), an experimental school program for preschool-aged kids. Since then, Dias has partnered with University of Chicago and Harvard economics professors to support and refine the program. The CHECC has helped close to 900 children.

Education 
Dias is a member of Harvard Business School's board of dean's advisors, a director of the Sciences Po American Foundation, and the French-American Foundation in New York.

Arts 
Dias is a trustee of the Museum of Modern Art, of the Musée des Arts Décoratifs, and of the Foundation for Contemporary Arts.

Dias is a former trustee of the Whitney Museum of American Art and the Chicago Symphony Orchestra, where she headed the investment committee. She was also a Trustee of the Chicago Council on Global Affairs, the Children's Memorial Medical Center and Foundation which is part of the Lurie Children’s Hospital at Northwestern University. Dias is a former director of Friends of Island Academy (FOIA).

Teaching 
Dias is an adjunct professor at Georgetown University's McDonough School of Business where she teaches a course on hedge fund strategies. The class straddles theoretical teachings and practical applications of the hedge fund industry. Guest speakers have come from the world’s top investment firms, including Elliott Associates, Tiger Global, Citadel, Carnegie Corporation, Monticello, Coatue, Paulson & Co., Magnetar and Viking.

Publications

Media 
Dias is a contributor on foreign policy issues, finance and economics as well as French politics for the Financial Times, the Huffington Post, The Chicago Tribune, and Crain’s Chicago Business.

In 2012, Dias launched Reboot Illinois, a news website and social media platform focused on Illinois politics, with over 650,000 monthly page views. During Dias’ ownership, Reboot Illinois was the recipient of multiple journalism awards. She sold her interest in the site to AFK Media Group in 2016.

Published papers 
Moss, David, Anne Dias, and Bertrand O. Stephann. The French Pension System: On the Verge of Retirement?, Harvard Business School Case 798-032.
Research Assistant, Walter Berns, ed. After the People Vote: A Guide to the Electoral College (2nd edition; Washington: AEI Press, 1992)
Research Assistant, Patrick J. Glynn, Closing Pandora's Box: Arms Races, Arms Control and a History of the Cold War (New Republic Books, 1992)

Personal life
Dias married hedge fund manager Kenneth Griffin in 2003. In 2015, Griffin and Dias divorced. The couple has joint custody over their three children.

Dias is a Republican, and has donated to campaign funds for various candidates.

She is a supporter of Emmanuel Macron's economic reforms and his movement La République en Marche.

Awards
Dias has been named as one of the most powerful women in finance by multiple publications, including U.S. Banker, and The Hedge Fund Journal. In 2006, she was featured in Crain's Chicago Business' "40 Under 40" list and Institutional Investor's "20 Rising Stars of Hedge Funds". She won the Harvard Club of Chicago's Annual Alumni Award in 2010.

References

1970 births
Living people
American hedge fund managers
American money managers
American women philanthropists
French emigrants to the United States
French hedge fund managers
French money managers
21st-century French philanthropists
20th-century French businesswomen
20th-century French businesspeople
Harvard Business School alumni
Illinois Republicans
Walsh School of Foreign Service alumni
Stock and commodity market managers
Place of birth missing (living people)
21st-century American businesswomen
21st-century American businesspeople
21st-century women philanthropists